José Carlos Semenzato (born 23 March 1968, in Cafelândia) is a Brazilian entrepreneur. He is the current president of SMZTO Holding de Franquias Setoriais, a franchise holding that he founded in 2010 and has ten affiliated companies: Casa X, United Idiomas, PartMed, OdontoCompany, L’Entrecôte de Paris, Espaçolazer, Joy Juice, Casa X, [Embelleze|Instituto Embelleze] and Gua.Co.

Biography 
Son of a bricklayer and a housewife, Semenzato started working at the age of 13. At the time, he sold, in the suburb of Lins (a city in the hinterland of the state of São Paulo), snacks produced by his mother. At 16 years old, he became a manager in a copy company. After this experience, he worked in a construction company learning how to program computers. At 18, he started teaching computing to high school students at Instituto Americano de Lins. At 23 years old, Semenzato founded Microlins, a computing school.

In 1994, he owned 17 Microlins schools and, after that, he decided to start expanding through franchising.

In 2010, Microlins had 700 schools in 500 Brazilian cities and was sold to Grupo Multi in a transaction of R$110 million.
 
In 2012, Semenzato partnered with the Brazilian TV host Xuxa Meneghel to found Casa X, a franchise company for parties and social events. In 2015, the entrepreneur and Meneghel became partners in Espaçolaser, a franchise company specialized in laser hair removal. 
LifeUSA, an English school franchise, was founded in 2016 in partnership with the Brazilian tennis player Gustavo Kuerten.

References

External links
 SMZTO Holding de Franquias
 LifeUSA
 PartMed
 OdontoCompany
 L’Entrecôte de Paris
 Espaçolaser
 Gua.Co
 Joy Juice
 Casa X

1968 births
Brazilian businesspeople
Brazilian people of Italian descent
Living people
People from São Paulo (state)